Critical Mass (known as Power! in North America) is a video game developed by Simon Francis and published in 1985 by Durell Software for the Amstrad CPC, Commodore 64, and ZX Spectrum.

Plot
An anti-matter power station on an orbiting asteroid is used by the local star system for energy.  The station has been taken over by hostile aliens who are threatening to overload the power system which will turn the reactor into a massive black hole and destroy not only the planetary system, but several nearby stars as well.

The object of the game is to make it to the heavily defended power station and disable it before the reactor reaches critical mass and implodes.

Gameplay
The player may control the hovercraft in either a normal joystick operational mode or with vectored movement. When the player pushes forward on the joystick, the hovercraft accelerates, and when pulling back on the joystick, speed decreases.

Reception
In 1988, Dragon reviewed Power!, and gave the game 4 out of 5 stars.

Reviews
Crash! - Dec, 1985
Your Spectrum - Dec, 1985
Sinclair User - Dec, 1985
Zzap! - Mar, 1986

References

External links

Critical Mass at Spectrum Computing

1985 video games
Amstrad CPC games
Commodore 64 games
Durell Software games
Video games developed in the United Kingdom
ZX Spectrum games